Ken Tschumper (born April 24, 1950) is an American farmer and politician.

Born in La Crescent, Minnesota, Tschumper received his bachelor's degree from Winona State University and went to graduate school at Saint Mary's University of Minnesota. He was a dairy farmer. He served as a Democrat in the Minnesota House of Representatives in 2007 and 2008. Tschumper was a 2012 Democratic candidate for District 28B of the Minnesota House of Representatives. In 2014, he ran for Houston County commissioner. One of his main points is to ban frac sand. He owns a farm in LaCrescent, Minnesota, with 3,200 acres and 35 cows.

Notes

1950 births
Living people
People from La Crescent, Minnesota
Saint Mary's University of Minnesota alumni
Winona State University alumni
Democratic Party members of the Minnesota House of Representatives
21st-century American politicians
Dairy farmers
Farmers from Minnesota